Sabá Héctor Sueyro (1889 – October 15, 1943) served as Vice President of Argentina. Sueyro was in office from the coup of June 7, 1943, until his death on October 15 of the same year.

On his death, although "the public hardly knew him" the Argentine government directed the country "to regard his death as a national calamity ... all broadcasters
were ordered to carry appropriate funeral programs".

Sueyro's brother, Rear Admiral Benito Sueyro, was Argentina's Minister of the Navy (1940–43).

External links
http://buscador.lavoz.com.ar/2003/0322/suplementos/temas/nota152973_1.htm (in Spanish)
Time (magazine)

1889 births
1943 deaths
People from Buenos Aires
Vice presidents of Argentina